The Lawe is a river of northern France, right tributary of the Lys. Its source is near Magnicourt-en-Comte. It flows generally northeast through Houdain, Bruay-la-Buissière, Béthune and Lestrem. It flows into the Lys in La Gorgue.

References

Rivers of France
Rivers of the Pas-de-Calais
Rivers of Nord (French department)
Rivers of Hauts-de-France